SuperBest was a chain of Danish supermarkets with approximately 220 stores around the country.

In 2007 they took over the two supermarket chains Iso and Dreisler Storkøb. After NorgesGruppen bought a 49% stake in SuperBest's parent company Dagrofa, the SuperBest brand was discontinued in favour of NorgesGruppen more upmarket Meny brand.

Notes

See also
Iso (supermarket)
Meny

Supermarkets of Denmark
Companies based in Ringsted Municipality
2015 disestablishments in Denmark
Defunct companies of Denmark